Raymond Joseph Gallagher (November 19, 1912 – March 7, 1991) was an American clergyman of the Roman Catholic Church who served as the third bishop of the Diocese of Lafayette in Indiana from 1965 to 1982.

Biography

Early life 
Raymond Gallagher was born in Cleveland, Ohio, to Hugh and Ella (née Reedy) Gallagher. He was educated at St. Thomas Aquinas Parish School (1918–1926) and Cathedral Latin High School (1926–1930). He earned a Bachelor of Arts degree from John Carroll University in University Heights, Ohio, in 1934, and attended St. Mary's Seminary in Baltimore, Maryland, from 1934 to 1939.

Priesthood 
Gallagher was ordained to the priesthood by Archbishop Joseph Schrembs for the Diocese of Cleveland on March 25, 1939. After his ordination, Gallagher served as a curate at St. Colman Parish in Cleveland (1939–1944).  In 1944, he enlisted in the United States Navy Chaplain Corps, serving there until 1946.  In 1948, Gallagher earned a Master of Social Work degree from Loyola University Chicago and became assistant director of diocesan Catholic Charities. 

Pope Pius XII named Gallagher a papal chamberlain in 1955. Between 1958 and 1959, he was a member of the President Dwight D. Eisenhower's Commission on Child Welfare, becoming chair of the White House Conference on Children and Youth in 1960. He served as general secretary of the National Conference of Catholic Charities from 1961 to 1965.

Bishop of Lafayette 
On June 21, 1965, Gallagher was appointed the third bishop of the Diocese of Lafayette in Indiana by Pope Paul VI. He received his episcopal consecration on August 11, 1965, from Archbishop Egidio Vagnozzi, with Bishops Leo Byrne and Clarence Issenmann serving as co-consecrators. 

On October 26, 1982, Pope John Paul II accepted his resignation as bishop of Lafayette. Raymond Gallagher died in Muncie, Indiana, on March 7, 1991, at age 78.

See also

References

External links
Roman Catholic Diocese of Lafayette, Indiana Official website

1912 births
1991 deaths
Religious leaders from Cleveland
Roman Catholic Diocese of Cleveland
Participants in the Second Vatican Council
American Roman Catholic clergy of Irish descent
20th-century Roman Catholic bishops in the United States
Roman Catholic bishops of Lafayette in Indiana
John Carroll University alumni
Saint Mary Seminary and Graduate School of Theology alumni
Loyola University Chicago alumni
World War II chaplains
United States Navy chaplains